Roger Carel (born Roger Bancharel; 14 August 1927 – 11 September 2020) was a French actor, known for his recurring film roles as Asterix, the French voice of Star Wars' C-3PO, and the French voice of Winnie-the-Pooh, Piglet, and Rabbit in Winnie the Pooh. He has also dubbed David Suchet as Hercule Poirot in Agatha Christie's Poirot. He also voiced Wally Gator, Mickey Mouse, Yogi Bear, Fred Flintstone, Kermit the Frog, Heathcliff, Danger Mouse, Foghorn Leghorn, ALF, Fat Albert and many other famous characters in French. He was born in Paris, France. Roger Carel died in Aigre, Charente at 93.

Filmography

Voice animation

 The Benny Hill Show (1951–1991, TV Series) as Benny Hill (French dubbing)
 Pixie and Dixie and Mr. Jinks (1958-1961) as Pixie / Dixie (French dubbing)
 The Flintstones (1960–1966) (TV series) as Fred Flintstone (French dubbing)
 One Hundred and One Dalmatians (1961) as Pongo (French dubbing)
 The Yogi Bear Show (1961-1962) as Yogi Bear (2nd French dubbing)
 Hey There, It's Yogi Bear! (1964) as Boo-Boo Bear (French dubbing)
 Hogan's Heroes (1965–1971, TV Series) as Colonel Crittendon (French dubbing)
 The Jungle Book (1967) as Kaa (French dubbing)
 Asterix the Gaul (1967) as Asterix
 Asterix and Cleopatra (1968) as Asterix / Caesar's Spy / Dogmatix
 The Aristocats (1970) as Roquefort / Lafayette (French dubbing)
 Groovie Goolies (1970) as Drac / Hagatha (French dubbing)
 Daisy Town (1971) as Undertaker / Cavalry Colonel
 Fat Albert and the Cosby Kids (1972-1985) as Fat Albert (French dubbing)
 Fritz the Cat (1972) as Fritz the cat (French dubbing)
 Heavy Traffic (1973) as Angie Corleone (French dubbing)
 Robin Hood (1973) as Sir Hiss the snake (French dubbing)
 Alice in Wonderland (1974) as Cheshire Cat (2nd French dubbing)
 Tarzoon: Shame of the Jungle (1975)  as Le second siamois / Short / Général anglais
 Pinocchio (1975) as Jiminy Cricket (2nd French dubbing)
 The Muppet Show (1976–1981, TV Series) as Kermit the Frog / The Announcer / Dr. Bunsen Honeydew (French Dubbing)
 The Twelve Tasks of Asterix (1976) as Asterix / Caius Tiddlius / Roman Senator #3 / Dogmatix
 Star Wars: Episode IV – A New Hope (1977) as C-3PO (French dubbing)
 The Many Adventures of Winnie the Pooh (1977) as Pooh / Piglet / Rabbit
 The Rescuers (1977) as Bernard (French dubbing)
 La Ballade des Dalton (1978) as Min Li Foo, le blanchisseur chinois / Mathias Bones, le joyeux croque-mort / Le crieur de journaux / Juan le Mexicain
 Once Upon a Time... (1978–2008, TV Series) Maestro / Peter
 Doctor Snuggles (1979–1980, TV Series) as Doctor Snuggles (French dubbing)
 Maeterlinck's Blue Bird: Tyltyl and Mytyl's Adventurous Journey (1980, TV Series) as Spirit of Fire / Spirit of Time / Spirit of Bread / Spirit of Milk / Narrator (french dubbing)
 Star Wars: Episode V – The Empire Strikes Back (1980) as C-3PO (French dubbing)
 Le chaînon manquant (1980) as Croak / Le gros con #4
  Danger Mouse (1981-1992) as Danger Mouse / Stiletto (French dubbing)
 The Fox and the Hound (1981) as Boomer (French dubbing)
 Minoïe (1981) as Le Grand Amiralissime
 Fanny and Alexander (1982) as Oscar Ekdahl (Allan Edwall) (French dubbing)
 The Mysterious Cities of Gold (1982, TV Series) as occasional narrator (French dubbing)
 Pac-Man (1982–1983, TV Series) as Blinky (French dubbing)
 La revanche des humanoides (1983)
 The Dragon That Wasn't (Or Was He?) (1983) as Olivier (French dubbing)
 Lucky Luke (1984) as Jolly Jumper
 Welcome to Pooh Corner (1983–1987, TV Series) as Pooh / Piglet / Rabbit (French dubbing)
 Star Wars: Episode VI – Return of the Jedi (1983) as C-3PO (French dubbing)
 The Right Stuff (1983) as Narrator (French dubbing)
 Heathcliff and The Catillac Cats (1984–1988, TV Series) as Heathcliff (French dubbing)
 Dumbo (1984) as Timothy Q. Mouse (2nd French dubbing)
 The Karate Kid (1984) as M. Kesuke Miyagi (French dubbing)
 Retenez Moi...Ou Je Fais Un Malheur (1984) as Jerry Logan
 Asterix Versus Caesar (1985) as Asterix / Dogmatix
 The Great Mouse Detective (1986) as Basil (French dubbing)
 The Karate Kid Part II (1986) as M. Kesuke Miyagi (French dubbing)
 Asterix in Britain (1986) as Asterix / Dogmatix
 ALF (1986–1990, TV Series) ALF (French dubbing)
 An American Tail (1986) as Digit (French dubbing)
 Spaceballs (1987) as President Skroob (French dubbing)
 The Big Bang (1987) as Général de l'USSSR, voix radio, commentateur du match de foot
 Duck Tales (1987–1989, TV Series) as Flintheart Glomgold / Duckworth the Butler (French dubbing)
 The New Adventures of Winnie the Pooh (1988–1991, TV Series) Pooh / Piglet / Rabbit
 The Land Before Time (1988) Petrie
 Agatha Christie's Poirot (1989–?, TV Series) as Hercule Poirot
 Asterix and the Big Fight (1989) as Asterix / Dogmatix
 The Rescuers Down Under (1990) as Bernard (French dubbing)
 Plaisir d'amour (1991) as Circé 
 Law & Order (1991–1992, TV Series) as Phil Cerreta (French dubbing)
 Les mille et une farces de Pif et Hercule (1993)
 Jurassic Park (1993) tour car guide's voice (French dubbing)
 The Swan Princess (1994) as Puffin (French dubbing)
 Asterix Conquers America (1994) as Asterix
 The Land Before Time II: The Great Valley Adventure (1994) as Petrie (French dubbing)
 The Land Before Time III: The Time of the Great Giving (1995) as Petrie (French dubbing)
 Mr. Men and Little Miss (1995-1997) as various male voices (French Dubbing
 Pooh's Grand Adventure: The Search for Christopher Robin (1997) as Pooh / Piglet / Rabbit (French dubbing)
 Air Bud (1997) as Norman Snively (French dubbing)
 Star Wars: Episode I – The Phantom Menace (1999) as C-3PO (French dubbing)
 The Tigger Movie (2000) as Pooh / Rabbit (French dubbing)
 The Towering Inferno (2000) as Harlee Clairborne
 Star Wars: Episode II – Attack of the Clones (2002) as C-3PO (French dubbing)
 The Jungle Book 2 (2003) as Kaa (French dubbing)
 Piglet's Big Movie (2003) as Pooh / Rabbit (French dubbing)
 Star Wars: Clone Wars (2003–2005, TV Series) as C-3PO (French dubbing)
 Robots (2005) as Madame Gasket (French dubbing)
 Desperate Housewives (2005–2010, TV Series) as Reverend Sikes
 Star Wars: Episode III – Revenge of the Sith (2005) as C-3PO (French dubbing)
 Lord of War (2005) as Simeon Weisz (French dubbing)
 Asterix and the Vikings (2006) as Asterix / Dogmatix
 Nocturna (2007) as Moka (French dubbing)
 Mr. Bean's Holiday (2007) as Vicar (French dubbing)
 My Friends Tigger & Pooh (2007–2010, TV Series) as Pooh / Rabbit (French dubbing)
 The Mummy: Tomb of the Dragon Emperor (2008) as Roger Wilson (French dubbing)
 Star Wars: The Clone Wars (2008) as C-3PO
 Star Wars: The Clone Wars (2008–2010, TV Series) C-3PO (French dubbing)
 Harry Potter and the Half-Blood Prince (2009) as Horace Slughorn (French dubbing)
 True Grit (2010) as Colonel Stonehill (French dubbing)
 Asterix: The Mansions of the Gods (2014) as Asterix / Dogmatix (final film role)

Live action 

 Meeting in Paris (1956) as Le gendarme devant le 'Ritz' (uncredited)
 L'ami de la famille (1957) as L'accordeur
 Le triporteur (1957) as Un paysan
 Incognito (1958) as Un agent
 Chéri, fais-moi peur (1958) as Kougloff, L'espion russe
 Le petit prof (1959) as Un employé de mairie
 Croquemitoufle (1959) as Maurice
 Auguste (1961) as Albert, le beau-frère
 L'empire de la nuit (1962)
 Les Bricoleurs (1963) as Le comte de la Bigle
 Ophélia (1963) as Worker
 La foire aux cancres (Chronique d'une année scolaire) (1963) as M. Garrigou
 La mort d'un tueur (1964) as Le patron du café
 Dulcinea del Toboso (1964)
 La grosse caisse (1965) as Souvestre
 Le Saint prend l'affût (1966) as Le professeur (uncredited)
 The Two of Us (1967) as Victor
 The Great Dictator (1940) as Le barbier (dubbed in 1968)
 Salut Berthe! (1968) as Camberlin
 A Flea in Her Ear (1968) as M. Plommard
 Béru et ces dames (1968) as Maximilien Bernal dit 'Max'
 Clérambard (1969) as Le curé
 The Brain (1969) as Frankie Scannapieco (voice, uncredited)
 A Golden Widow (1969) as Aristophane Percankas – un riche armateur grec
 Et qu'ça saute! (1970) as Fedorovitch
 On est toujours trop bon avec les femmes (1971) as Frank Dillon
 Delusions of Grandeur (1971) (uncredited)
 Le Viager (1972) as La voix du speaker des actualités (voice)
 Églantine (1972) as Ernest
 Elle cause plus, elle flingue (1972) as Sammy
 Le petit poucet (1972) as Récitant / Narrator (voice)
 Les Charlots font l'Espagne (1972) as Le capitaine du grand voilier (voice, uncredited)
 Joë petit boum-boum (1973) as Bzz
 L'Heptaméron (Joyeux compères) (1973) as Maître Bornet
 The Big Store (1973) as Le commissaire priseur
 The Holes (1974) as Alberto Sopranelli, le ténor
 Le plumard en folie (1974) as La voix du lit (voice)
 Q (1974) as Récitant / Narrator (uncredited)
 Soldat Duroc, ça va être ta fête! (1975) as Oberst Strumpf
 Les grands moyens (1976) as Commissaire Honoré Compana
 La grande récré (1976) as Le pharmacien
 La grande frime (1977) as Chomer
 Dis bonjour à la dame!.. (1977) as L'inspecteur des PTT
 La Gueule de l'autre (1979) as Roland Favereau
 Les phallocrates (1980) as Le directeur de l'asile
 Jupiter's Thigh (1980) as Sacharias, le conservateur
 The Umbrella Coup (1980) as Salvatore Bozzoni
 Signé Furax (1981) as Grigor Sokolodovenko
 Le retour des bidasses en folie (1983) as Kolonel von Berg
 One Deadly Summer (1983) as Henri dit 'Henri IV'
 Le jeune marié (1983) as M. Santoni, Nina's father
 Les malheurs d'Octavie (1983) as André Perlin
 L'émir préfère les blondes (1983) as Sam Moreau
 Y a-t-il un pirate sur l'antenne? (1983) as Le commissaire Keller
 Le diable rose (1988) as General Von Goteborg
 Les Gauloises blondes (1988) as Cuchulain
 La folle journée ou Le mariage de Figaro (1989) as Don Guzman Brid'Oison
 Comédie d'amour (1989) as Le docteur
 1001 Nights (1990) as The Great Vizier
 My Man (1996) as Passerby In Hat

Bibliography

References

External links
 

1927 births
2020 deaths
French male film actors
French male television actors
French male video game actors
French male voice actors
Male actors from Paris
20th-century French male actors
21st-century French male actors